is a Japanese manga series written by Sekka Iwata and illustrated by Yu Aoki. It began serialization on the Shōnen Jump+ website and mobile app in October 2021. As of February 2023, the series' individual chapters have been collected into six volumes by Shueisha. Shueisha also publishes the series in English on their Manga Plus website and app.

Plot summary
The story takes place in a world where being a magical girl is a popular profession that involves exterminating mysterious creatures called . New college graduate Kana Sakuragi, who is struggling with job hunting, is able to put her excellent memory to use and helps magical girl Koshigaya exterminate a Kaii in an emergency. Happy she has finally been useful, Sakuragi ends up becoming the second magical girl at Magilumiere, the magical girl startup company Koshigaya works at. In addition to the prodigy Koshigaya, Magilumiere is composed of its president Kouji Shigemoto, a middle-aged man who dresses as a magical girl, Kaede Midorikawa, who deals with customers, and magic engineer Kazuo Nikoyama.

Publication
Written by Sekka Iwata and illustrated by Yu Aoki, Magilumiere Co. Ltd. began serialization on Shueisha's Shōnen Jump+ manga website and mobile app on October 20, 2021. The individual chapters are being collected into tankōbon volumes, with the first released on February 4, 2022.

Shueisha's Manga Plus service is publishing the series in English digitally.

Volume list

Chapters not yet in tankōbon format
These chapters have yet to be published in a tankōbon volume. They were serialized on Shōnen Jump+.

Reception
Masaki Endo from Tsutaya News felt the series was unique among works of the magical girl genre; Endo also praised the balance between fantasy and reality. Makoto Kitani from Da Vinci praised the comedic elements of the story and the artwork; Kitani also felt the story was unique among magical girl works. Steven Blackburn from Screen Rant praised the series, particularly enjoying the comedic moments. He also noted that the series worked well as a satire of Sailor Moon.

The series was nominated for the 2022 Next Manga Award in the web manga category, and ranked third out of 50 nominees.

References

External links
  
 
 

Japanese webcomics
Magical girl anime and manga
Satire anime and manga
Shōnen manga
Shueisha manga
Webcomics in print